Kevin Hooks (born September 19, 1958) is an American actor, and a television and film director; he is notable for his roles in Aaron Loves Angela and Sounder, but may be best known as Morris Thorpe from TV's The White Shadow.

Early life and acting career
Kevin Hooks was born in Philadelphia, Pennsylvania, the son of Yvonne, a state employee, and Robert Hooks, a director and actor who starred in many films in the 1970s. Kevin's nickname among his friends is "King Royal".

Hooks lived in Southwest, Washington, D.C. in the late-1970s. He attended Potomac High School in Oxon Hill, Maryland.

When he was still 10, Kevin starred in the acclaimed J.T., a 1969 episode of the CBS Children's Hour about a sensitive Harlem youth who befriends a sick cat. Written by Jane Wagner, it was a Peabody Award winner.

Hooks appeared in the hit 1972 movie Sounder as the pre-teen elder son of Paul Winfield's and Cicely Tyson's characters, providing the point of view of the film. He held the story together as a boy thrust into being "man of the family" on a sharecropping farm during the Depression. The adults were nominated for Best Actor and Best Actress Oscars respectively for their performances.

Hooks won a role in the last film directed by Gordon Parks, Jr., Aaron Loves Angela (1975). Set in contemporary Harlem at New York's grittiest and most depressing ebb, that film was regarded as a "blaxploitation" version of Romeo and Juliet, using African American and Puerto Rican ethnicity in lieu of medieval families. While playing a withdrawn teenager, Hooks created electricity opposite the 15-year-old Irene Cara. Jose Feliciano in a bit part and a little comic relief lighten the grimness, as the young lovers encounter nothing but intolerance, and the secret location where they meet becomes the site of a dangerous drug deal. The movie was popular locally and praised by fans, but widely considered a weakly plotted failure.

Hooks went on to portray high school basketball player Morris Thorpe in the successful TV series about high-school basketball, The White Shadow, which ran from 1978 to 1981. Morris Thorpe was reportedly voted one of America's 100 favorite characters in the history of television.

In 1986, he starred in the short-lived ABC sitcom He's the Mayor.

Director roles
In 1991, Hooks directed the film Strictly Business, and also appeared in one scene opposite Kim Coles.  He directed Wesley Snipes in Passenger 57, Cynthia Rothrock and Stacy Keach in Irresistible Force,  Laurence Fishburne and Stephen Baldwin in Fled, and also Patrick Swayze in Black Dog. Hooks worked as a director and producer on the series Prison Break. He also directed two episodes from the first season of Lost, "White Rabbit" and "Homecoming".

In 2003, Hooks revisited Sounder. He directed ABC's Wonderful World of Disney's TV remake of the film, with Paul Winfield, his co-star from the original, playing a different role.

Hooks directed the following episodes of Prison Break:

1.14 - "The Rat"
1.22 - "Flight"
2.01 - "Manhunt"
2.09 - "Unearthed"
2.14 - "John Doe"
2.22 - "Sona"
3.01 - "Orientacion"
3.06 - "Photo Finish"
3.12 - "Hell or High Water"
4.01 - "Scylla"
4.11 - "Quiet Riot"
4.16 - "The Sunshine State"
4.22 - "Killing Your Number"

He directed the film Prison Break: The Final Break (2009) based on the series.

Hooks is credited as the director of the 2017 Madiba, a three-part BET television special about the life of the late Nelson Mandela and the struggle of the ANC which with the leadership of Mandela, famously succeeded to overthrow the regime of apartheid in South Africa, starring Laurence Fishburne in the role of Mandela.

In 2020, he directed an episode on The Good Lord Bird.

References

Bibliography
 Holmstrom, John. The Moving Picture Boy: An International Encyclopaedia from 1895 to 1995. Norwich, Michael Russell, 1996, p. 324.

External links

1958 births
Male actors from Philadelphia
African-American male actors
African-American film directors
African-American television directors
American male film actors
American male child actors
Film directors from Pennsylvania
American male television actors
American television directors
Television producers from Pennsylvania
Living people
Artists from Philadelphia
African-American male child actors
21st-century African-American people
20th-century African-American people